Nisi Mac Niata (or Nissi Mac Niatach, fl. 560 AD) lived in 6th century Gaelic Ireland. Nothing is known of his life, but his death left a legacy for a millennium. Namely, the Túath where he died was renamed in his honour, and his brother Saint Caillín obtained a substantial honour price in compensation under Brehon Law, securing a revenue stream for the famous monastery of Fenagh.

Life

He belonged to the tribe of Conmaicne-Rein who lived in present-day South Leitrim and West Longford. He was probably a noble or a priest, and close associate of his sibling Caillín. Little else is known of his life.

His death is described in both prose and rhyme by the ancient  along the following lines. Next morning for some unknown reason, Nisi was killed unlawfully by Cellachan who then had to pay Nisi's brother a substantial "body fine" and honour price in compensation. Nisi was interred at Fenagh.

Legacy
Nisi's "honour price" became the perpetual claim by the monastic settlement at Fenagh to patronage from Moynish nobles.

<blockquote>
From Cellachan the active,
The proud plain had been named;
Magh-Nissi, manifest famous,
Is its name from that time down.
Their land and their tributes,
Caillin got for the deed.
</blockquote>

The name of Nisi was forgotten when Gaelic Ireland collapsed in the 17th century. Irish nobles had their estates confiscated in the plantations of Leitrim. The English incorporated Moynish into the barony of Leitrim and Cromwellian forces plundered Moynish in 1652. Though forgotten today, the place name of Moynish is preserved by the Irish annals and English Fiants.

Pedigree
The mythical pedigree of Nisi Mac Niata is as follows:

 Nisi, 
 brother of Caillín,
 Son of Niata, (or Niatach and Niataig)
 Son of Duban,
 Son of Fraech,
 Son of Cumscrach,
 Son of Echt, (or Cecht)
 Son of Erc,
 Son of Eredal, (or Erdail)
 Son of Echt, (or Cecht)
 Son of Dubh,
 Son of Moghruadh, (or Medhruagh)
 Son of Nert,
 Son of Fornert,
 Son of Echt, (or Cecht)
 Son of Uisel,
 Son of Beire, (or Beiri)
 Son of Beidhbhe, (or Beidhbe)
 Son of Doilbhre,
 Son of Lugaid Conmac, (or Lughaidh)
 Son of Oirbsen Mór,   ("Oirbsen the great". See also "Loch Oirbsen", in Co. Galway.)
 Son of Ethedon, (or Sethdon)
 Son of Seghda,
 Son of Art, (or Atri)
 Son of Allta,  (or Alta)
 Son of Oghamun, (or Ogamun)
 Son of Fidhchar,
 Son of Doilbhre,
 Son of Eon,
 Son of Cetguine Calusach,
 Son of Mochta,
 Son of Mesoman, (or Mesamun'')
 Son of Mogh Taeth,
 Son of Conmac, (the mythical ancestor of the Conmhaícne tribe.)
 Son of Fergus,
 Son of Rossa,
 Son of Rudraige.

Notes and references

Notes

Citations

Primary sources

Secondary sources

External links

 

History of County Leitrim
6th-century Irish people
6th-century births
6th-century deaths
People from County Leitrim
Year of death unknown
People of Conmaicne Maigh Nissi